Daran (also Romanized as Dārān; also known as Dārānā) is a village in Daran Rural District of the Central District of Jolfa County, East Azerbaijan province, Iran. At the 2006 National Census, its population was 947 in 320 households. The following census in 2011 counted 934 people in 374 households. The latest census in 2016 showed a population of 900 people in 381 households; it was the largest village in its rural district.

References 

Jolfa County

Populated places in East Azerbaijan Province

Populated places in Jolfa County